The Itaxueiras River is a river of Maranhão state in northeastern Brazil. Itaxueiras river is in the basin of Tocantins river. It also a branch of this river.

See also
List of rivers of Maranhão

References
Brazilian Ministry of Transport

Rivers of Maranhão